"Faking It" is a song written and performed by Scottish DJ and record producer Calvin Harris featuring American singer Kehlani and American rapper Lil Yachty. It was released as the fifth and final single from Harris's fifth studio album, Funk Wav Bounces Vol. 1 (2017). It was written by Harris, Lil Yachty, and Jessie Reyez, being produced by Harris himself, and was released to contemporary hit radio in the US on 17 October 2017 through Columbia Records. It was sent to radio in Italy on 24 November 2017 through Sony.

Composition
Musically, "Faking It" is a downtempo R&B and pop song that contains elements of Miami bass and 1980s pop music.

Music video
The official music video was released on 23 October 2017. It was directed by Emil Nava. It features Yachty wearing Clout Goggles and sitting on an icy car. It also features Kehlani sitting on a throne next to a dog; Harris makes a cameo near the end.

Track listings

Charts

Weekly charts

Year-end charts

Certifications

Release history

References

2017 singles
2017 songs
Calvin Harris songs
Columbia Records singles
Lil Yachty songs
Kehlani songs
Songs written by Calvin Harris
Songs written by Lil Yachty
Songs written by Jessie Reyez